Babna Gora is a small settlement in the Municipality of Trebnje in eastern Slovenia. The municipality is included in the Southeast Slovenia Statistical Region. The entire area is part of the historical Lower Carniola region.

References

External links

Babna Gora at Geopedia

Populated places in the Municipality of Trebnje